Much Loved (also known as Zin Li Fik) is a 2015 French-Moroccan  drama film directed by Nabil Ayouch about the prostitution scene in Marrakesh. It was screened in the Directors' Fortnight section at the 2015 Cannes Film Festival. The film has been banned in Morocco for its "contempt for moral values and the Moroccan woman". It was screened in the Contemporary World Cinema section of the 2015 Toronto International Film Festival.

It is one of the first films to address the issue of prostitution in Morocco. Following the lives of four female sex workers, it brings to the forefront the exploitation of prostitutes by pimps, and the corruption of the police who sometimes even profit from the trade. The film stirred a national debate before it was released when a few video clips were leaked on the web showing unsimulated sex scenes. The lead actress received death threats, and religious authorities condemned the film for portraying a negative image of Morocco, with its portrayals of extramarital sex and sympathetic views towards homosexuals.

Cast 
 Loubna Abidar as Noha 
 Asmaa Lazrak as Randa 
 Halima Karaouane as Soukaina 
 Sara Elmhamdi Elalaoui as Hlima 
 Abdellah Didane as Said 
 Danny Boushebel as Ahmad

Production
Loubna Abidar deceived the filmmaker Nabil Ayouch during the casting process, going so far as to disguise herself as a prostitute to pass the casting.

Accolades

References

External links
 

2015 films
2010s erotic drama films
2010s Arabic-language films
Films about prostitution in Morocco
French erotic drama films
Moroccan drama films
Films directed by Nabil Ayouch
2015 drama films
French LGBT-related films
2015 LGBT-related films
2010s French films